The Strawberry Schoolhouse is a historic one-room school building located in northwestern Gila County, Arizona, in the small mountain community of Strawberry. Built of pine logs in 1885, the Strawberry Schoolhouse is reputed to be the "oldest standing schoolhouse in Arizona" and now functions as a fully restored local history museum, complete with a late-19th century classroom exhibit.

The Strawberry School was formally dedicated as a Historical Monument on August 15, 1981, and was added to the National Register of Historic Places on May 10, 2005. It is often called the "oldest standing schoolhouse" remaining in Arizona, but is closely outdated by the Arivaca Schoolhouse in Arivaca, Arizona, which was built six years earlier in 1879.

See also

 National Register of Historic Places in Gila County, Arizona

References

Schools in Gila County, Arizona
School buildings completed in 1885
1885 establishments in Arizona Territory
History of Gila County, Arizona
School buildings on the National Register of Historic Places in Arizona
One-room schoolhouses in Arizona
Defunct schools in Arizona
History museums in Arizona
Buildings and structures in Gila County, Arizona
National Register of Historic Places in Gila County, Arizona